Indian Creek is a stream in the U.S. states of Kansas and Missouri. It is a tributary of the Blue River.

Indian Creek was named for the Indians who once passed through the area.

See also
List of rivers of Kansas
List of rivers of Missouri

References

Rivers of Johnson County, Kansas
Rivers of Jackson County, Missouri
Rivers of Missouri